Frigate Island may refer to:

 Frigate Island (Grenada), in the Grenadines in the Caribbean
 Frigate Island (Saint Lucia), off Saint Lucia in the Caribbean

See also
 Frégate Island, in the Seychelles